Floating Figure is a 1927 sculpture by Gaston Lachaise.

Casts
According to the National Gallery of Australia, seven bronze casts were made at Modern Art Foundry in Long Island City, New York, and are located at the Museum of Modern Art, the Society Hill Project in Philadelphia, the Ray Stark Collection in Beverly Hills, California, the Sheldon Museum of Art at the University of Nebraska–Lincoln in Lincoln, Nebraska, the Putnam Collection of Sculpture at Princeton University in New Jersey, and the National Gallery of Australia in Canberra.

See also

 1927 in art

References

External links
 

1927 sculptures
Bronze sculptures in Australia
Bronze sculptures in California
Bronze sculptures in Nebraska
Bronze sculptures in New Jersey
Bronze sculptures in New York City
Bronze sculptures in Pennsylvania
Collections of the National Gallery of Australia
Princeton University Art Museum
Sculptures of the Museum of Modern Art (New York City)
Sculptures of women in Australia
Sculptures of women in California
Sculptures of women in Nebraska
Sculptures of women in New Jersey
Sculptures of women in New York City
Sculptures of women in Pennsylvania
Statues in Australia
Statues in California
Statues in Nebraska
Statues in New Jersey
Statues in New York City
Statues in Pennsylvania
University of Nebraska–Lincoln
Nude sculptures in Pennsylvania